Kirbya setosa is a species of bristle fly in the family Tachinidae.

Distribution
United States, Mexico.

References

Diptera of North America
Dexiinae
Taxa named by Charles Henry Tyler Townsend
Insects described in 1915